Karel Tuns (born 16 January 1906, date of death unknown) was a Belgian boxer who competed in the 1924 Summer Olympics.

In 1924 he was eliminated in the second round of the featherweight class after losing his fight to Harry Dingley.

References 

1906 births
Year of death missing
Featherweight boxers
Olympic boxers of Belgium
Boxers at the 1924 Summer Olympics
Belgian male boxers